= Robert Pelton =

Canadian academic

Dr Robert Pelton is a professor of chemical engineering at McMaster University in Hamilton, Canada. He is the holder of the Canada Research Chair in Interfacial Technologies and has been awarded for his work on paper research.
